The canton of Carmaux-1 Le Ségala is an administrative division of the Tarn department, southern France. It was created at the French canton reorganisation which came into effect in March 2015. Its seat is in Carmaux.

It consists of the following communes:
 
Almayrac
Andouque
Assac
Cadix
Carmaux (partly)
Courris
Crespin
Crespinet
Le Dourn
Faussergues
Fraissines
Jouqueviel
Lacapelle-Pinet
Lédas-et-Penthiès
Mirandol-Bourgnounac
Montauriol
Moularès
Padiès
Pampelonne
Rosières
Saint-Cirgue
Sainte-Gemme
Saint-Grégoire
Saint-Jean-de-Marcel
Saint-Julien-Gaulène
Saint-Michel-Labadié
Saussenac
Sérénac
Tanus
Tréban
Trébas
Valderiès
Valence-d'Albigeois

References

Cantons of Tarn (department)